Faktor A (in Russian Фактор А) is the second Russian version of The X Factor television talent show franchise. Having broadcast on Rossiya 1from 2011 to 2013, the show is named Faktor A (rather than Faktor X), with the letter "A" chosen in honor of Alla Pugacheva, head of the jury. Faktor A debuted in 2011 as a new season 1.

Sekret Uspekha (2005, 2007)

Faktor A is considered a continuation of an earlier Russian show Sekret Uspekha, which was broadcast on Russia's RTR television station in contrast to Faktor A, courtesy of Russia-1.

There were two seasons of Sekret Uspekha. The first was in 2005 and the title was won by Vladimir Sapovsky. A second season was broadcast in 2007, and the title won by Nikolay Timokhin. The show was cancelled after two seasons because of the insufficient number of viewers.

Although similar in format, the new show Faktor A was considered a whole new series with season 1 starting in April 2011.

Series Summary
 Contestant in "15-25s" category
 Contestant in "Over 26s" category
 Contestant in "Groups" category

Series overview

  Contestant in team Roman (Groups)
  Contestant in team Lolita (ages 16–24)
  Head of jury Αlla
  Contestant in team  Boris Krasnov (25 and older)
  Contestant in team Igor Nikolaev (ages 16–24)

Season 1 (2011)
The new Faktor A show's main purpose was to find new singing talent. Contestants were chosen through public auditions. The show was hosted by Philipp Kirkorov and Volodymyr Zelenskyy. The jury was made up of Lolita Milyavskaya, Boris Krasnov and Roman Emelyanov. Alla Pugacheva served as chairman of the jury. Milyavskya was the mentor for contestants aged 16 to 24, Krasnov for contestants over the age of 25, and Emelyanov for duos groups.

The auditions were held on 23 and 24 March 2011 in Moscow's Malaya Luzhniki Sports Arena. Then each judge selected their best three performers after trials from 25–27 March 2011.

Categories
The competition was split into three categories: 
Singers aged 16 to 24
Singers over 25
Groups (including duos).

Each judge was assigned a particular category and was entrusted to mentor the competitors in that specific category.

Contestants
 – Winner
 – Runner-up
 – Third Place

Shows
Show 1 (1 April 2011) - first stage of auditions
Show 2 (8 April 2011) - second stage of auditions and deciding the 9 finalist
Show 3 (15 April 2011) - first live show (Theme: "Soviet Popular Songs")
Show 4 (22 April 2011) - second live show (Theme: "Songs from the movies"). Vladislav Tumanov originating from Ekaterinburg was eliminated finishing 9th
Show 5 (19 April 2011) - third live show (Theme: "World Hits"). Philip Krishkov originating from Moscow was eliminated finishing 8th
Show 6 (6 May 2011) - fourth live show (Theme: "Songs of Love"). Group Шестое чувство ("The Sixth Sense") from Moscow eliminated finishing 7th.
Show 7 (13 May 2011) - fifth live show (Theme: "Songs about cities and countries). The duo ДаКи ("DaKi") from Kaluga were eliminated finishing 6th.
Show 8 (20 May 2011) - sixth live show (Theme: "Modern Hits"). Through public vote, "Mark Twain" and Victoria Cherentsova were voted bottom two by the public. But Alla Pugacheva decided to keep both in competition.
Show 9 (27 May 2011) - seventh live show (Themes: Favorite songs" and "Author's songs"). After the decision of the previous week to save both bottom 2 from elimination, it was agreed that two contestants would be eliminated at the end of show 9 from a bottom three announced. The bottom three were: Group Mark Twain, and contestants Sergei Savin and Victoria Cherentsova. Then it was announced that Mark Twain had received the fewest votes and was eliminated first 5th. Eventually Victoria Cherentsova was eliminated finishing 4th. Sergei Savin moves to Final 3. 
Show 10 (3 June 2011) - eighth live show (Themes: "Candidate's most successful song during all stages of competition" and "Duet with famous Russian pop singers". As a result of public vote, Erkin Holmatov was considered "safe". In the danger zone were the other two Top 3 finalist Sergei Savin and Artyom Kacharyan. As a result of a jury vote, Artyom Kacharyan was eliminated finishing 3rd overall in the competition.
Show 11 (10 June 2011) - the final show. After all the participants opened the show with a collective song, the two finalists Erkin Holmatov and Sergei Savin sang a duet, as well as two solo songs each. The winner of the project was determined by public voting and by voting by judges Boris Krasnov, Lolita and Roman Emelyanov (1 vote each) and Alla Pugacheva (2 votes) and the audience (2 votes). As a result, on the final results show on June 11, 2011, Sergei Savin (in Russian Сергей Савин) was announced winner of the inaugural season, and Erkin Holmatov (in Russian Эркин Холматов) as runner-up.

Final classification
Sergei Savin - Winner
Erkin Holmatov - Runner-Up
Artyom Kacharyan
Victoria Cherentsova
Group Марк Твен ("Mark Twain")
Duo ДаКи ("DaKi")
Шестое чувство ("Sixth Sense")
Philip Kruzhkov
Vladislav Tumanov

Prizes
Sergei Savin, who won the inaugural season, received a record deal for a solo album, a shooting of a music video and appearing on rotation on Russian radio station Avtoradio ("Авторадио"). The runner-up Erkin Holmatov received a cash prize of 30,000 Euros, the special prize "Golden Star of Alla" from main judge Alla Pugacheva, a 5-year scholarship to a music school in Gnessin.

See also
 The Voice (Russia)

References

External links
Faktor A page on Russia 1 television

Russia-1 original programming
Russia
Russian music television series
2011 Russian television series debuts
Russian reality television series
2010s Russian television series
Television series by Fremantle (company)
Russian television series based on British television series
Alla Pugacheva